In molecular biology, nuclear ribonuclease P (RNase P) is a ubiquitous endoribonuclease, found in archaea, bacteria and eukarya as well as chloroplasts and mitochondria. Its best characterised enzyme activity is the generation of mature 5′-ends of tRNAs by cleaving the 5′-leader elements of precursor-tRNAs. Cellular RNase Ps are ribonucleoproteins. The RNA from bacterial RNase P retains its catalytic activity in the absence of the protein subunit, i.e. it is a ribozyme. Similarly, archaeal RNase P RNA has been shown to be weakly catalytically active in the absence of its respective protein cofactors. Isolated eukaryotic RNase P RNA has not been shown to retain its catalytic function, but is still essential for the catalytic activity of the holoenzyme.  Although the archaeal and eukaryotic holoenzymes have a much greater protein content than the bacterial ones, the RNA cores from all three lineages are homologous—the helices corresponding to P1, P2, P3, P4, and P10/11 are common to all cellular RNase P RNAs. Yet there is considerable sequence variation, particularly among the eukaryotic RNAs.

References

Further reading

External links 
 
 RNase P

Non-coding RNA